Johanna Schall (born 19 September 1958) is a German actress. She appeared in 23 films and television shows between 1976 and 2003. She starred in Apple Trees, which was screened in the Un Certain Regard section at the 1992 Cannes Film Festival. She is the daughter of actors Ekkehard Schall and Barbara Brecht-Schall, and the granddaughter of Bertolt Brecht and Helene Weigel.

Selected filmography
 The House on the River (1986)
 Apple Trees (1992)

References

External links

1958 births
Living people
German film actresses
Actresses from Berlin
German television actresses
20th-century German actresses
21st-century German actresses
People from East Berlin